Annie Blake is a Canadian politician, who was elected to the Yukon Legislative Assembly in the 2021 Yukon general election. She represents the electoral district of Vuntut Gwitchin as a member of the Yukon New Democratic Party.

She finished in a 78–78 tie with incumbent MLA Pauline Frost on election night, which was further confirmed on a recount. Under Yukon election law, an exact tie between candidates is settled by drawing lots, and Blake was drawn as the winner. This was the second time in the history of the district, following the 1996 Yukon general election, that an election resulted in an exact tie settled in this manner.

Blake currently serves as Deputy Speaker and Chair of Committee of the Whole of the Yukon Legislative Assembly

Electoral record

References 

Living people
Yukon New Democratic Party MLAs
Women MLAs in Yukon
First Nations politicians
21st-century Canadian women politicians
Year of birth missing (living people)